Street Fighter Alpha: The Animation, released in Japan as , and also known as Street Fighter Zero: The Movie, is a 2000 OVA based on the fighting game Street Fighter Alpha 2 by Capcom. It was directed by Shigeyasu Yamauchi. An English dubbed version was later produced by Manga Entertainment and released in 2001 on the 10th anniversary of Street Fighter II: The World Warrior.

The film is not a prequel or sequel to either Street Fighter II: The Animated Movie or Street Fighter II V, but an independent installment, although a handful of voice actors from previous adaptations reprised their roles for the English version of the movie.

Plot
Ryu is contemplating the death of his sensei, Gouken, and experiencing trouble with the "Dark Hadou", an evil energy which Gouken's brother, Akuma, succumbed to. While in the city, Ryu fights off agents working for Shadaloo, gaining the attention of Interpol agent Chun-Li. Aspiring martial artist Sakura becomes a fan of Ryu and vows to track him down and become his student.

In Japan, Ryu is confronted by a mysterious fortune-teller named Rose, who questions him about his hold over the Dark Hadou and reason for fighting. While visiting Gouken's grave, Ryu meets his old friend, Ken Masters. They are approached by a young boy named Shun, who claims he is Ryu's long lost brother. According to Shun, their mother raised Shun in Brazil, and she sent Shun to find Ryu before she died. Ken is skeptical, but Ryu takes Shun in and notices the boy's potential as a fighter. One night Ryu succumbs to the Dark Hadou, nearly killing Ken. Ryu instructs Ken to kill him if he is ever completely possessed by the Dark Hadou. Ken agrees.

Ken and Shun enter an underground fighting tournament. On the way there, they are harassed by street thugs. Ryu and Shun fight them off effortlessly, but Ryu notices a sadistic streak in Shun, whom he has to punch to stop him from killing one of the thugs. Ken, meanwhile, finds Sakura in a local bar and agrees to take her to Ryu. He is too late to enter the tournament, to his chagrin. Ryu is found by Chun-Li. In the tournament, watched by its enigmatic organiser, Dr. Sadler, Shun is pitted against the wrestler Zangief. Shun pummels Zangief with his superior speed, but the Dark Hadou catches up with Shun, distracting him long enough to receive a beating from Zangief. Ryu steps in and fights Zangief, but he too is overcome by the Dark Hadou and discharges a Dark Hadouken which misses Zangief but causes the building to start collapsing. As Ken takes an injured Sakura to safety, Ryu is confronted by a huge man, Rosanov, who proves to be more than a match for Ryu and Chun-Li combined. Rosanov prepares to knock Ryu unconscious. Shun steps in and takes the blast. Enraged, Ryu obliterates Rosanov with another Dark Hadouken. While Ryu is distracted, Shun is abducted by Shadaloo agents.

Ryu loses the will to fight. Rose appears before him, compelling him to save Shun. Ryu first goes to see Akuma in his secluded home in the mountains, accompanied by Chun-Li. Akuma, under the belief that Ryu has come to challenge him, attempts to goad him into succumbing to the Dark Hadou. Ryu refuses, and Akuma orders him to leave. Ryu asks Akuma if he is Shun's father or has any family whatsoever, but Akuma denies it. Ryu travels to Sadler's hideout to rescue Shun, accompanied by Ken, Chun-Li, Guy, Dan, Dhalsim, Birdie, Adon, Rolento and Sodom.

As the other fighters battle outside Sadler's lab, Ryu, Ken and Chun-Li sneak inside to find Shun. They are confronted by Rosanov, who is upgraded as a fighting machine. He makes quick work of Ken, Chun Li, and Birdie, blowing up parts of the hideout. Ryu arrives and realizes that Rosanov is actually an android with Shun inside, who is working for Sadler. Shun goads Ryu into using a Dark Hadouken, since he is connected to Sadler and every blow landed on him will increase Sadler's fighting potential through absorption. The Dark Hadouken frees Shun and destroys Rosanov. With this sudden increase in power, Sadler bursts out of his lab and pummels Ryu. Rose intervenes, informing Ryu in a vision that "you haven't drawn the death card yet". Inspired, Ryu fires a normal Shinku Hadouken directly into Sadler, who crumbles into dust.

As Shun succumbs to his injuries, he reveals that he lied to Ryu about being his brother and worked with Sadler so as to raise money for his mother, who still died. Ryu tells Shun that he is still his brother, and vows never to use the Dark Hadou again. The street fighters return to their everyday lives.

Cast
Main

Secondary

Reception
Anime News Network criticized the open ending of Street Fighter Alpha but praised its plot, detailed animation, music, and the quality of both the Japanese and English voice acting. They gave it an A-.

References

External links 
 

2000 martial arts films
2000 films
2000 anime films
Anime films based on video games
Group TAC
Japanese martial arts films
Japanese sports films
Martial arts fantasy films
Martial arts tournament films
OVAs based on video games
Street Fighter anime and manga
Alpha Movie
Underground fighting films
Films directed by Shigeyasu Yamauchi

ja:ストリートファイターZERO#ストリートファイターZERO - THE ANIMATION -